Ahuacuotzingo  is a city and seat of the Ahuacuotzingo Municipality, in the state of Guerrero, south-western Mexico. Ahuacuotzingo is known in the region as one of the most important producers of maize.

References

Populated places in Guerrero